The Imperial Service Medal (ISM) is a medal affiliated with the Imperial Service Order. The medal was established under the statutes of the Imperial Service Order, on 8 August 1902, by King Edward VII, with the first awards appearing in the London Gazette in May 1903.

Eligibility
It is presented upon retirement to selected civil servants, not belonging to the administrative or clerical branches, who complete at least 25 years meritorious service. It is primarily an award to manual and industrial grades, including workers in H M Dockyards and, prior to 1969 when it moved from central government control, the Post Office. Prison officers were eligible prior to the establishment in 2010 of the Prison Services Long Service Medal. The minimum period of service was 20½ years in India prior to independence in 1947, and 16 years in unhealthy climates in other countries.

Appearance
When originally created the Imperial Service Medal was a seven-pointed star, or a laurel wreath for women, in the same pattern as the Imperial Service Order, but with the star or laurel in bronze. In 1920 an amendment of the statutes changed the appearance of the medal to its current form: a circular silver medal,  in diameter, bearing the effigy of the reigning sovereign on the obverse. To date, here have been six versions:

The reverse bears the image of a naked man resting from his labours with the inscription "For Faithful Service". The name of the recipient is impressed on the rim of the medal. Recipients are listed in the London Gazette.

References

Civil awards and decorations of the United Kingdom
Long service medals
Awards established in 1902
1902 establishments in the United Kingdom